Dundee TMD was a traction maintenance depot located in Dundee, Scotland. The depot, in Dundee's West End was situated beside Buckingham Junction, on the Glasgow–Dundee line and near the closed Dundee Esplanade railway station on the East Coast Main Line's northern extension.

The depot code was DE.

Allocation 

The depot was noted for having an allocation of Class 06 shunters, along with some first generation DMUs.

References 

Rail transport in Scotland
Dundee
Transport in Dundee
Railway depots in Scotland